BVE may stand for:

BVE Trainsim
Black Vernacular English
In the United States
In the United Kingdom
Bachelor of Vocational Education
Batallón Vasco Español
The IATA airport code of Brive–Souillac Airport